Shakthi FM is a Sri Lankan Tamil language channel available on air. The word "Shakthi" is an ancient rich Tamil word stands for "power", (shakthi = power translation in English) from ancient Hinduism lord shakthi means god of power. One of the  Tamil radio channel with island-wide coverage, including the Jaffna Peninsula and most parts of the North Eastern Province of Sri Lanka, Shakthi FM broadcasts music, live news, interactive interviews and a host of other programme formats that are innovations in Tamil radio in Sri Lanka. shakthi.fm is a website almost have all Tamil mp3 songs.

Frequencies
Islandwide-103.9 MHz, 104.1 MHz.

References

External links
Official site of Shakthi FM
Shakthi FM Live
MBC Networks

Tamil-language radio stations in Sri Lanka
MBC Networks